Kim Woo-bin (born Kim Hyun-joong on July 16, 1989) is a South Korean actor and model. He began his career as a runway model and made his acting debut in the television drama White Christmas. He subsequently gained attention in A Gentleman's Dignity (2012), and made his breakthrough with School 2013 (2012-2013) and The Heirs (2013). Kim later starred in box office hits Friend: The Great Legacy (2013), The Con Artists (2014) and Twenty (2015). In 2016, he took on his first leading role on television in Uncontrollably Fond.

In May 2017, Kim's agency announced that Kim would be taking a hiatus after he was diagnosed with nasopharyngeal cancer. Kim subsequently returned to screen in 2022 with the TV series Our Blues and Black Knight and also with the sci-fi action film Alienoid, directed by Choi Dong-hoon.

Career

2009–2012: Beginnings
Kim wanted to pursue a modeling career since he was a high school student. He debuted as a runway model in 2009 at the age of 20 and began appearing in prêt-à-porter and Seoul Fashion Week collections.

As his modeling career progressed, he started doing commercial films and began studying acting, under the guidance of acting coach Moon Won-joo. Kim fell in love with acting, saying, "I found myself feeling the same thrill and enthusiasm that I felt the first time I came to walk on the runway".

Under the stage name Kim Woo-bin, he made his acting debut in 2011, starring in the mystery drama White Christmas and the low-rated cable sitcom Vampire Idol.

In 2012, he had a supporting role in the romantic comedy drama A Gentleman's Dignity, written by famed screenwriter Kim Eun-sook. Next came a two-episode guest appearance in drama adaptation of the popular manga To the Beautiful You.

2013: Rising popularity

Kim's breakout year came in 2013 with two hit dramas and one film. From late December to early 2013, he starred in the teen drama School 2013. He received his first acting award for the role at the 2nd APAN Star Awards under the category Best New Actor.

The same year, he was cast in Kim Eun-sook's teen drama The Heirs, which became popular domestically and internationally with a peak audience rating of 28.6% and 1 million hits on the Chinese streaming website iQiyi. Kim experienced a surge in popularity overseas. This led to increased advertising contracts and acting offers for the actor.

Kim then appeared in his first major film role in Friend: The Great Legacy, the blockbuster sequel to Kwak Kyung-taek's 2001 box office hit. He received positive reviews for his portrayal as a young gang member. The same year he became the host of cable music program M! Countdown from August 15, 2013, to February 13, 2014.

2014–2017: Success in film and hiatus
After his rise in popularity in 2013, Kim continued appearing in big screen projects. In January 2014, he was cast in the heist movie The Con Artists, in which he played a top safe-cracker alongside rising star Lee Hyun-woo.  He then took on a comedic character in indie director Lee Byung-heon's sophomore effort Twenty in 2015.

Kim then appeared in an ad campaign for Calvin Klein Watches + Jewelry, making him the first East Asian model for the brand.

In 2015, Kim was cast in his first television leading role in the melodrama Uncontrollably Fond, written by screenwriter Lee Kyung-hee. The drama premiered on July 6, 2016.

He then starred in crime action film Master alongside Lee Byung-hun and Kang Dong-won. The movie premiered in December 2016 and became the 11th bestselling film for 2016 in South Korea.

In 2017, Kim was cast in crime caper film Wiretap by Choi Dong-hoon. The project has since been suspended to allow Kim to seek treatment for cancer.

2020–present: Return to screen
On March 11, 2020, AM Entertainment announced that Kim would be returning to the big screen in Choi Dong-hoon's upcoming sci-fi film Alienoid alongside Ryu Jun-yeol and Kim Tae-ri. The film premiered in July 2022 and Kim played the role of 'Guard', a person in charge of managing alien prisoners.

Also in 2022, Kim co-starred in acclaimed screenwriter Noh Hee-kyung's television series Our Blues, and will star in Netflix original series Black Knight.

Personal life 
Kim is best friends with fellow model-actor and School 2013 co-star Lee Jong-suk, whom he has known since their modeling days.

Relationship 
Since May 2015, Kim has been in a relationship with model-actress Shin Min-a.

Health 
On May 24, 2017, Kim was diagnosed with nasopharyngeal cancer. Kim's agency, Sidus HQ, said Kim had begun drug and radiation treatment and would halt all activities. On December 29, Kim announced, in a letter, that he had completed his treatment plan for the cancer. However, he was still exempted from military service.

Philanthropy 
On March 8, 2022, Kim donated  million to the Hope Bridge Disaster Relief Association to help the victims of the massive wildfires that started in Uljin, Gyeongbuk. and also spread to Samcheok, Gangwon. On Christmas Day, Kim sent gifts and sent a handwritten letter for about 200 children who are hospitalized in the children's ward of Asan Hospital in Seoul.

In January 2023, Kim donated 100 million won to Asan Medical Center in Seoul, the donation will be used to support the treatment of poor patients.

Ambassador activities
In 2013, Kim was named honorary ambassador for his alma mater, Jeonju University. The same year, he was appointed the public relations ambassador of the 2013 Suwon Information Science Festival; and ambassador of the "Good Downloader Campaign" organized by the Korean Film Council and Film Federation Against Piracy.

In 2015, Kim was chosen as the promotional ambassador of CJ CGV's arthouse exhibition chain CGV ARTHOUSE.

In April 2017, Kim was appointed as an honorary ambassador for the 2018 Winter Olympics in Pyeongchang, South Korea. Kim is the second actor to take on this role and was set to take part in various activities to promote the event. In October, however, he was pulled from the role due to his ongoing cancer treatments.

Filmography

Film

Television series

Web series

Hosting and documentary

Music video

Discography

Songs

Soundtrack appearances

Awards and nominations

Listicles

References

External links

 
 

South Korean male models
1989 births
Living people
People from Seoul
South Korean male television actors
South Korean male film actors
21st-century South Korean male actors